Mounir Chaftar (born 29 January 1986 in Frankfurt am Main) is a German football defender of Tunisian descent.

Career

Wacker Nordhausen
Chaftar joined FSV Wacker 90 Nordhausen in the summer 2016. In October 2019, he was relegated to the club's reserve team alongside 4 other teammates. He left the club at the end of the year.

References

External links 

1986 births
Living people
Footballers from Frankfurt
German footballers
Eintracht Frankfurt players
Eintracht Frankfurt II players
Kickers Offenbach players
MSV Duisburg players
SV Wacker Burghausen players
VfL Bochum players
VfL Bochum II players
1. FC Saarbrücken players
FSV Wacker 90 Nordhausen players
Germany youth international footballers
Germany under-21 international footballers
Bundesliga players
2. Bundesliga players
3. Liga players
Regionalliga players
German people of Tunisian descent
Association football defenders